At the Dressing-Table. Self-Portrait is a 1909 painting by Ukrainian-French painter Zinaida Serebriakova. The painting is in the collection of the Tretyakov Gallery in Moscow. Its size is 75 × 65 cm.

At the Dressing-Table was executed by Serebriakova in 1909 while she was living near Neskuchnoye, Kursk Governorate (now is a part of Kharkiv Oblast of Ukraine). According to Serebriakova, the winter came early in that year, there was a lot of snow, but it was warm in the house, so "she started to paint herself in the mirror, entertaining by drawing different small things from her dressing-table".

On the insistence of Eugene Lanceray, her brother, Serebriakova sent At the Dressing-Table to Saint-Petersburg. It was exhibited at the 7th exhibition of the Union of Russian Artists, which moved from Moscow in the beginning of 1910. The painting was well received by the public and art critics. The painter Valentin Serov called it a "very cute and fresh thing", while the painter and critic Alexandre Benois wrote that Serebriakova "gave to Russian public such a wonderful gift, such a "smile from ear to ear", that one cannot fail to thank her for that". Right after the exposition the painting was bought by the Tretyakov Gallery.

The current self-portrait At the Dressing-Table is considered one of the most important works of Serebriakova along with Bath-house (1913, Russian Museum), Harvest (1915, Odessa Art Museum) and Whitening Canvas (1917, Tretyakov Gallery).

References

Literature 
 
 
 
 
 
 
 
 
 
 

1909 paintings
Self-portraits
Collections of the Tretyakov Gallery
Paintings by Zinaida Serebriakova
Mirrors in art